The Blanco Formation, originally named the Blanco Canyon Beds,  is an early Pleistocene geologic formation of clay, sand, and gravel whitened by calcium carbonate cementation and is recognized in Texas and Kansas. 

After the Ogallala had lain exposed for some time since the Neogene, developing a thick caliche petrocalcic horizon under the surface, deposition of sand and gravel by wind and east-flowing streams resumed to lesser extent during the early Pre-Illinoian glaciation cycles of the Pleistocene. As the weathering and erosion of the exposed Ogallala, rich in calcium carbonate, contributed heavily to the formation, the resulting material is white (blanco). This gave the name to Blanco Canyon, which in turn is the type locality for the Blanco Formation. Exceptionally flat, it is conjectured that the limestone beds in the Texas region formed within broad, shallow lakes. 

In much of its extent in Kansas, the Blanco is buried under deep Pleistocene loess and soil deposits and a certain amount of knowledge of the unit comes from well drilling. While the whole of the unit is clay, sand, and gravel, the lower part of the unit is coarser material and the upper part is finer and plastic, with enough distinction to identify two members. In Kansas, the upper member is named Fullerton and the lower is named Holdrege for their respective correspondence with the Fullerton Formation and Holdrege Formation that are identified in Nebraska. The Blanco is not recognized as a unit in Nebraska.

See also

 List of fossiliferous stratigraphic units in Texas
 Paleontology in Texas
 List of fossiliferous stratigraphic units in Kansas
 Paleontology in Kansas

References

Geologic formations of Texas
Geologic formations of Kansas